Cellulomonas xylanilytica is a Gram-positive, aerobic, cellulolytic, xylanolytic and non-motile bacterium from the genus Cellulomonas.

References

 

Micrococcales
Bacteria described in 2004